Blair Gap, one of the gaps of the Allegheny, is a water gap along the eastern face atop the Allegheny Front escarpment.  Like other gaps of the Allegheny, the slopes of Blair Gap were amenable to foot travel, pack mules, and possibly wagons allowing Amerindians, and then, after about 1778-1780 settlers, to travel west into the relatively depopulated Ohio Country decades before the railroads were born and tied the country together with steel. 

The gap was used historically for the upper sections of the Allegheny Portage Railroad, which as was authorized by the enabling acts in 1824 of Pennsylvania's Main Line of Public Works as part of the Pennsylvania Canal System which originally envisioned linking Pittsburgh to Philadelphia by canals. In the early 1900s, U.S. Route 22 followed alongside the watercourse through the gap.

Until the 1920s, after new founded auto clubs gathered enough numbers to political clout to push for initiatives creating roads between towns, off the railroads the primary means of travel town to town was on foot or where hauling was needed, using wagons. There were only five ways through the Appalachians east to west: Around the bottom (plains or Piedmont area) in Georgia, the Cumberland Gap, the Cumberland Narrows, the gaps of the Allegheny Front, and up the Hudson River then around the north end of the Catskills and across Upstate New York to the Great Lakes. 

All other transits involve difficult climbs a man on foot can only make with great difficulty, and which animal drawn transport could not. Geographically and geologically, without the large projects and engineering capabilities of the 20th century, there were exactly three internal regions where it was possible to get animal powered vehicles from the east side to the west side of the Appalachian Mountains, making five routes overall counting traveling around the plains at either end of the western chain. Below Canada, the geologic nature of successive barrier ridges of the Ridge and Valley Appalachians runs from the valley of the Hudson, the Delaware Water Gap down through all of northern Pennsylvania, sundering eastern and central Pennsylvania, Maryland, North Carolina, Virginia, Western Pennsylvania, West Virginia, Kentucky, and Tennessee.

Notes

References

{[authority control}}

Landforms of Blair County, Pennsylvania
Water gaps of Pennsylvania